Pakhal may refer to:

 Pakhal (film), Bangladesh television film
 Pakhal Lake in Telangana, India
 Pakhal Sarkar, a populated places in Pakistan
 Pakhal Tirumal Reddy, Indian artist
 Pakhala, Indian food from Odisha state